Vũ or Võ (武) is a common Vietnamese surname.  Vũ is primarily used by Vietnamese who live in the north, while Võ mostly is used by Vietnamese who live in the south (from Quảng Bình Province to the south).  The latinized vũ has a noun meaning of "feather", and as a verb refers to the act of dancing, while the latinized võ has a very different meaning, referring to military service, the art of fighting, wrestling or judo. Vũ might also be derived from 雨, meaning rain. Rarer derivations may include 禹, 羽, 萭.

Notable people with the surname Vũ or Võ

Academia
Tuan Vo-Dinh - Vietnamese biochemist
Võ Tòng Xuân - Vietnamese former university administrator, also known as Dr. Rice

Arts and Entertainment
Bao Vo — Vietnamese American musician
Tracy Vo — Vietnamese Australian journalist and news presenter
Võ Hoàng Yến – Vietnamese supermodel
Anh Vu — Vietnamese Norwegian singer and actress
Cuong Vu — Vietnamese American jazz trumpeter
Thuy Vu — Vietnamese American journalist and news presenter 
Tom Vu – Vietnamese American poker player and former infomercial star

Military
Võ Tánh – Vietnamese 18th century military commander
Võ Nguyên Giáp – Vietnamese 20th century military commander

Politics
Võ Chí Công – Communist party member and late 20th century President of Vietnam
Hubert Vo – Vietnamese American Democratic politician
Võ Văn Kiệt (born Phan Văn Hòa) – late 20th century Prime Minister of Vietnam
Võ Hồng Phúc – retired Vietnamese communist politician
Võ Văn Thưởng — 11th President of Vietnam
Vũ Hồng Khanh – 20th century Vietnamese revolutionary opposing both French and Communist rule
Vũ Văn Mẫu – last Prime Minister of South Vietnam

Sports
Lilia Vu – Vietnamese American professional golfer
Vũ Văn Thanh – Vietnamese professional footballer
Vũ Ngọc Thịnh – Vietnamese professional footballer
Vũ Minh Tuấn – Vietnamese professional footballer

See also
List of common Vietnamese surnames

References

Vietnamese-language surnames
Surnames of Vietnamese origin